John Francis "Jack" Stites (born 13 October 1953 in Wayland, Massachusetts, United States; died August 13, 2018), was a former American International motorcycle trials rider. He was also a motorsport commentator for the BBC in England during the 1980s.

Biography
During his earlier riding years Stites won the Southeastern Trials Riders Association regional title (STRA) four times from 1978 through 1981.
In 1980 he finished 5th in the US NATC Championship after scoring in all six rounds, taking a win at round six in Texas.

Competing in the FIM World Trials round held in the US, Stites placed 15th and out of the points.
The 1982 season saw Stites finish runner up to Bernie Schreiber in the NATC Championship. He won the opening round held in California and the final round in Texas, as well as being on the podium a further three times. At this years US round of the FIM World Championship Stites was 19th and again outside of the points. 

1983 and another attempt at the FIM World round, this time landing a 22nd place.

Between 1984 and 1990 Stites was co-host of the popular BBC Trials show "Kick Start" alongside presenter Peter Purves.
 He also found time to finish 16th at the US world round in 1984.

Stites finished 14th in the US World round of 1985, giving him 2 championship points and 32nd place in the series.

In 1994 Stites made a return to competition, this time in the second tier NATC Expert class. He won the opening two rounds in Florida and went on to finish runner-up in the series to defending champion Ron Schmelzle.

In 2017 Stites was inducted into the North American Trials Council (NATC) hall of fame.

Stites passed away after a battle with cancer at his home in Florida on 13 August 2018.

National Trials Championship Career

International Trials Championship Career

Honors
 STRA Trials Champion 1978, 1979, 1980, 1981

Related Reading
 NATC Trials Championship
 FIM Trial European Championship
 FIM Trial World Championship
 Trial des Nations

References 

1953 births
2018 deaths
American motorcycle racers
Motorcycle trials riders